Igor Alexeyev may refer to:

 Igor Alekseyev (politician) (born 1960)
 Igor Alekseyev (weightlifter) (born 1972), Russian weightlifter
 Igor Alexeyev (footballer) (born 1984), Russian footballer